Manzanillo or manzanillo (Spanish for "little apple", literally) may refer to:

Manzanillo, Colima, a city in Mexico
Manzanillo Municipality, Colima, the surrounding municipality
Manzanillo, Cuba, a city
Manzanillo Port, a port in Dominican Republic
Manzanillo, Valladolid, a municipality in the province of Valladolid, Spain
Manzanillo Bay, a bay on the Atlantic coast of Panama, near the eastern entrance to the Panama Canal
Manzanillo Island, a small island in that bay
Manzanillo International Terminal, a port terminal on that bay
Manzanillo, Limón, Costa Rica, a fishing village in the south-east of Costa Rica, on the Caribbean Sea coast
Manzanillo, a nickname given to the Teenage Mutant Ninja Turtle Rafaelo in an episode
 Manzanillo (olive) (Olea europaea 'Manzanillo', also known as the "olive of Seville") the most common variety of Spanish olive, a medium-sized green to purple-black olive cultivar grown especially in and around Seville, Andalusia; also, the Manzanillo olive tree as a whole, rather than just its fruit; often misspelled Manzanilla
Manzanillo (sternwheeler), a steamboat in Oregon in the late 19th century

See also
 Manzanilla (disambiguation)